The 2000 AF2 season was the first season of the af2. It was succeeded by 2001. The league champions were the Quad City Steamwheelers, who capped off a perfect season with a victory over the Tennessee Valley Vipers in ArenaCup I. This is the only AF2 season lacking division alignment.

League info

Standings

Playoffs

Awards and honors

Regular season awards

ArenaCup I

ArenaCup I was the 2000 edition of the af2's championship game, in which the National Conference runners-up Tennessee Valley Vipers were defeated by the National Conference Champions Quad City Steamwheelers in Moline, Illinois by a score of 68 to 59.

External links
 2000 af2 stats
 Arena Cup I Stats
 Quad City Steamwheelers Main Web-Site 
 Quad City Steamwheelers on ArenaFan.com
 Quad City Steamwheelers' Fan Club Website
 Steamwheelin' Blog

Af2 seasons